Waimangu is a place in Rotorua, New Zealand that got affected by the 1886 eruption of Mount Tarawera. It is known for Waimangu Volcanic Rift Valley. Waimangu is a thirty minutes drive from Rotorua.

References 

Geothermal areas in New Zealand
Rotorua